The men's team sabre was one of eight fencing events on the fencing at the 1964 Summer Olympics programme. It was the twelfth appearance of the event. The competition was held from October 22 – 23 1964. 61 fencers from 13 nations competed.

Results

Round 1

Ties between teams were broken by individual victories (in parentheses), then by touches received.

Championship rounds

Fifth place semifinal

Rosters

Argentina
 Rafael González
 Juan Carlos Frecia
 Julian Velásquez
 Alberto Lanteri

Australia
 Alexander Martonffy
 Les Tornallyay
 Paul Rizzuto
 Brian McCowage
 Henry Sommerville

France
 Jean-Ernest Ramez
 Jacques Lefèvre
 Claude Arabo
 Marcel Parent
 Robert Fraisse

Germany
 Dieter Wellmann
 Klaus Allisat
 Walter Köstner
 Jürgen Theuerkauff
 Percy Borucki

Great Britain
 Richard Oldcorn
 Sandy Leckie
 Ralph Cooperman
 Michael Howard
 Bill Hoskyns

Hungary
 Péter Bakonyi
 Miklós Meszéna
 Attila Kovács
 Zoltán Horváth
 Tibor Pézsa

Iran
 Houshmand Almasi
 Bizhan Zarnegar
 Shahpour Zarnegar
 Nasser Madani

Italy
 Wladimiro Calarese
 Giampaolo Calanchini
 Pierluigi Chicca
 Mario Ravagnan
 Cesare Salvadori

Japan
 Fujio Shimizu
 Teruhiro Kitao
 Seiji Shibata
 Mitsuyuki Funamizu

Poland
 Jerzy Pawłowski
 Ryszard Zub
 Andrzej Piątkowski
 Emil Ochyra
 Wojciech Zabłocki

Romania
 Attila Csipler
 Octavian Vintilă
 Tănase Mureșanu
 Ion Drîmbă

Soviet Union
 Umyar Mavlikhanov
 Mark Rakita
 Yakov Rylsky
 Boris Melnikov
 Nugzar Asatiani

United States
 Alfonso Morales
 Robert Blum
 Gene Hámori
 Attila Keresztes
 Thomas Orley

References

Sources
 

Fencing at the 1964 Summer Olympics
Men's events at the 1964 Summer Olympics